The February 1906 City of London by-election was a parliamentary by-election held on 27 February 1906 for the British House of Commons constituency of City of London, which covered the "Square Mile" which was the United Kingdom's traditional financial district.

The seat had become vacant on the resignation of Alban Gibbs, one of the constituency's two Conservative Members of Parliament (MPs). Gibbs had resigned in order to provide a safe seat for Arthur Balfour. He would go on to succeed his father, Hucks Gibbs, as Baron Aldenham the following year.

Balfour had been out of Parliament following his defeat at Manchester East in the 1906 general election. He had been Prime Minister between 1902 and 1905 and at the time was Leader of the Conservative Party, with Joseph Chamberlain filling in as Leader of the Opposition while Balfour was out of Parliament.

Candidates 
65-year old Thomas Gibson Bowles, who had been Unionist Member of Parliament for King's Lynn from 1892 until 1906 stood as a Free Trader candidate. The Free Traders were a group of former Conservatives opposed to Balfour's policy of tariff reform, instead preferring free trade.

Votes

See also
 List of United Kingdom by-elections
 City of London constituency
 1887 City of London by-election
 April 1891 City of London by-election
 June 1891 City of London by-election
 1904 City of London by-election
 June 1906 City of London by-election
 1922 City of London by-election
 1938 City of London by-election
 1940 City of London by-election

References
 

City of London by-election,02
City of London by-election,02
City of London,1906,02
1906,02